Eton Manor Rugby Club is an English rugby union club based in the London Borough of Redbridge. The first XV team currently plays in London 1 North. The club spent a single season in National League 3 London & SE - 2015-16 - but was immediately relegated back to London 1 North. The club has three other senior men's sides who play in the Essex merit leagues, as well as a thriving mini and youth section with rapidly growing girls teams.

Honours
London 2 North East champions (2): 1988–89, 2005–06
London 2 North champions: 1990–91
Eastern Counties 1 champions: 2000–01
London 1 (north v south) promotion playoff winners: 2014–15

See also
 Essex RFU

References

English rugby union teams
Rugby union clubs in London
Sports clubs in England